The Federation of Agriculture (FECAMPO) was a trade union representing workers in agricultural sector in Spain.

The union was founded in 1977, as an affiliate of the Workers' Commissions.  By 1981, it had 15,689 members, and as of 1994 its membership had grown slightly, to 17,899.  In 2000, it merged with the Federation of Food Processing, to form the Federation of Agrifood.

References

Agriculture and forestry trade unions
Trade unions established in 1977
Trade unions disestablished in 2016
Trade unions in Spain